D.VII aircraft may refer to:

World War I German fighters
 Fokker D.VII
 LFG Roland D.VII
 Albatros D.VII
 Pfalz D.VII
 Aviatik D.VII
 Schütte-Lanz D.VII
 Kondor D.VII

Modern replicas
 Airdrome Fokker D-VII
Loehle Fokker D-VII
World War I Aeroplanes Fokker D.VII

See also
List of surviving Fokker D.VIIs